Calosoma subaeneum is a species of ground beetle in the subfamily of Carabinae. It was described by Maximilien Chaudoir in 1869.

References

subaeneum
Beetles described in 1869